Face the Music  is a 1954 British crime drama film directed by Terence Fisher, starring Alex Nicol, Eleanor Summerfield and Paul Carpenter.  It was produced by Hammer Films and shot at Bray Studios outside London with sets designed by the art director J. Elder Wills. It was released in the United States by Lippert Pictures under the title The Black Glove.

Synopsis
An American trumpet player in Britain is accused of murdering a beautiful blues singer.

Cast
 Alex Nicol as James Bradley
 Eleanor Summerfield as Barbara Quigley
 John Salew as Maxie Maguilies
 Paul Carpenter as Johnny Sutherland
 Geoffrey Keen as Maurie Green  
 Ann Hanslip as Maxine Halbard  
 Fred Johnson as Detective Sergeant MacKenzie  
 Martin Boddey as Inspector Mulrooney  
 Arthur Lane as Jeff Colt
 Paula Byrne as Gloria Lewis Colt
 Leo Phillips as Dresser
 Freddie Tripp	as Stage manager
 Ben Williams as Gatekeeper
 Frank Birch as Trumpet Salesman
 Jeremy Hawk as Recording Technician
 Melvyn Hayes as 	Hotel Bellhop

Critical reception
Allmovie dismissed it as "Not one of Fisher's more rousing films"; and the Radio Times called it an "adequate mystery."

References

Bibliography
 Hutchings, Peter. Terence Fisher. Manchester University Press,  2017.

External links

1954 films
1954 crime drama films
British crime drama films
British black-and-white films
Films based on British novels
Films directed by Terence Fisher
Films about music and musicians
Hammer Film Productions films
Lippert Pictures films
Films shot at Bray Studios
Films set in London
1950s English-language films
1950s British films